Otter Creek Reservoir is a reservoir (elevation approximately ) located in southeastern Piute County Utah, United States.

Description
The reservoir is a popular location for rainbow trout fishing.

A larger city within a one-hour drive is Richfield.

See also
 List of dams and reservoirs in Utah

References

External links

 
 
  by the Utah Division of Water Quality

Reservoirs in Utah
Lakes of Piute County, Utah
State parks of Utah
Protected areas of Piute County, Utah